Ammar Ben Sassi (born 19 February 1990) is a Tunisian football forward.

References

1990 births
Living people
Tunisian footballers
CA Bizertin players
ES Métlaoui players
El Makarem de Mahdia players
US Ben Guerdane players
ES Hammam-Sousse players
Association football defenders
Tunisian Ligue Professionnelle 1 players